Jhat Pat, also spelled as Jhatpat, Dera Allah Yar is a sub-division of Jaffarabad District of Balochistan province, Pakistan. Jhat Pat district lies in southeast of the Pakistani province of Balochistan. Jaffarabad District headquarters are at Dera Allah Yar formerly and still known as Jhatpat among locals. [2] Jaffarabad District is sub-divided into three tehsils. The main tribes of this district are: Hanbhi,Jamali, Umrani, Brahui, Khoso, Bulledi, Magsi, Babbar, Behrani while internally displaced people of Bugti tribes also live in Jafarabad. Other minority communities are Gola, Lashari, Domki, and small number of Bhanger, Abro tribes.

The City formerly was known as Dera Allah Yar

References

Populated places in Jafarabad District